Purple is the third studio album by German recording artist Leslie Clio. Released on 19 May 2017 in German-speaking Europe, it marked her debut with the Embassy of Music label following her departure from Vertigo Records.  Coinciding with Clio's appearance on the fifth season of the reality television series Sing meinen Song – Das Tauschkonzert, the German adaptation of The Best Singers series, a deluxe edition of Purple is expected to be released on 25 May 2018.

Track listing
Credits adapted from the liner notes of Purple.

Charts

References

External links 
 Official website

2017 albums
Leslie Clio albums